Caroline O'Hanlon is a Northern Ireland netball international and an Armagh ladies' Gaelic footballer. She has also represented Ireland at international rules. She was a member of the Northern Ireland teams at the 2003, 2011 and 2019 Netball World Cups and at the 2014 and 2018 Commonwealth Games. She was also a member of the Northern Ireland teams that were silver medallists at the 2012 and 2017 European Netball Championships. She captained Northern Ireland at both the 2018 Commonwealth Games and at the 2019 Netball World Cup. She carried the flag of Northern Ireland during the 2018 Commonwealth Games opening ceremony. She has played in the Netball Superleague for Team Northumbria, UWS Sirens and Manchester Thunder. She was a member of the Manchester Thunder team that won the 2019 Netball Superleague. As a Ladies' Gaelic footballer she played for Armagh in the 2006 All-Ireland final. She has also been an All Star on three occasions and was named as the 2014 TG4 Senior Player's Player of the Year. In 2010 she was named Northern Ireland Sportswoman of the Year.

Early life, family and education
O'Hanlon is the daughter of Charlie and Marion O'Hanlon. Her father is a farmer. Like his daughter, he also played Gaelic football for both St Patrick's Carrickcruppen and Armagh. He was a member of the St Patrick's team that won three Armagh Senior Football Championships in 1978, 1979 and 1982. Her mother was a teacher. She has one sibling, a sister Joanne. O'Hanlon was educated at Sacred Heart Grammar School and at Queen's University Belfast. O'Hanlon began playing both Gaelic football and netball at an early age.  Her family home is in Bessbrook, County Armagh. O'Hanlon is a doctor and studied medicine at Queen's. She has worked at both Craigavon Area Hospital and Daisy Hill Hospital and as a GP in the Newcastle and Dundrum areas of County Down.

Netball

Clubs

Larkfield
O'Hanlon plays netball for the Lisburn–based Larkfield club in the Northern Ireland Premier League. She has captained the team to several leagues titles and cup wins. Her team mates at Larkfield include fellow Northern Ireland internationals, Neamh Woods and Michelle Drayne.

Team Northumbria
As part of their preparations for the 2014 Commonwealth Games, the Northern Ireland national netball team formed a partnership with Team Northumbria. This saw O'Hanlon and six other Northern Ireland internationals – Oonagh McCullough, Noleen Lennon, Fionnuala Toner, Gemma Gibney, Michelle Drayne and Niamh Cooper – play for Team Northumbria during the 2014 Netball Superleague season. O'Hanlon and Toner also played for Team Northumbria during the 2015 season.

UWS Sirens
O'Hanlon played for UWS Sirens during the 2017 Netball Superleague season.

Manchester Thunder
In 2018 O'Hanlon began playing for Manchester Thunder. She was a member of the Manchester Thunder team that won the 2019 and 2022 Netball Superleague.

International

Northern Ireland
O'Hanlon was a member of the Northern Ireland teams at the 2003, 2011 and 2019 Netball World Cups and at the 2014 and 2018 Commonwealth Games. She was also a member of the Northern Ireland teams that won the 2009 and 2015 Nations Cups. She was Player of the Tournament at the latter tournament. She was also a member of the Northern Ireland teams that were silver medallists at the 2012 and 2017 European Netball Championships. She captained Northern Ireland at both the 2018 Commonwealth Games and at the 2019 Netball World Cup. She also carried the flag of Northern Ireland during the 2018 Commonwealth Games opening ceremony. O'Hanlon is one of several of several Ladies' Gaelic footballers to play netball for Northern Ireland. Others include Neamh Woods (Tyrone), Laura Mason (Down) and Michelle Drayne, Emma and Michelle Magee (all Antrim).

Great Britain
O'Hanlon has also represented Great Britain at university level. She has played both for and against the Great Britain university team.

Gaelic football

Club level
At club level, O'Hanlon plays for St Patrick's Carrickcruppen. In 2010 she captained the club to their first Armagh Senior Ladies' Football Championship. She was named player of the match in the final after scoring 1–6. O'Hanlon scored 0–4 for Queen's University in the 2014 O'Connor Cup final as they lost 3–7 to 1–9 against University of Limerick.

Inter-county
She played for Armagh in the 2006 All-Ireland Senior Ladies' Football Championship Final against . Cork won 1–7 to 1–6. O'Hanlon scored 0–2 in the final.
In 2014 she captained Armagh to the Ulster title, defeating  2–14 to 1–8 in the final. O'Hanlon scored 1–2 in the final. In 2015 she captained Armagh to the 2015 Ladies' National Football League Division 2 title.

In 2006, 2012 and 2014 O'Hanlon was selected as an All Star. In 2012 she was named the TG4 Intermediate Player's Player of the Year and in 2014 she was named the TG4 Senior Player's Player of the Year. She was the first non-Cork player to win the award.

International rules football
O'Hanlon was a member of the Ireland women's international rules football team that defeated  Australia in the 2006 Ladies' International Rules Series.

Honours

Individual
Northern Ireland Sportswoman of the Year 
 2010

Netball
Northern Ireland
Nations Cup
Winners: 2009, 2015: 2 
European Netball Championship
Runner up: 2012, 2017: 2 
Manchester Thunder
Netball Superleague
Winners: 2019: 1
Larkfield
NI Premier League
Winners: 2014, 2015, 2016, 2017: 4 ?

Gaelic football
Armagh
All-Ireland Senior Ladies' Football Championship
Runners Up: 2006 
Ulster Senior Ladies' Football Championship
Winners: 2014  
Ladies' National Football League Division 2 
Winners: 2015
St Patrick's Carrickcruppen 
Armagh Senior Ladies' Football Championship
Winners: 2015
Queen's University
O'Connor Cup 
Runner up: 2014
Individual
All Stars
 2006, 2012, 2014: 3
TG4 Senior Player's Player of the Year
 2014
TG4 Intermediate Player's Player of the Year
 2012

References

1984 births
Living people
Armagh ladies' Gaelic footballers
Queen's University Belfast Gaelic footballers
Northern Ireland netball internationals
British netball players
Netball Superleague players
Team Northumbria netball players
Sirens Netball players
Manchester Thunder players
Ireland women's international rules football team players
Netball players at the 2014 Commonwealth Games
Netball players at the 2018 Commonwealth Games
Commonwealth Games competitors for Northern Ireland
2019 Netball World Cup players
Irish expatriate sportspeople in England
Alumni of Queen's University Belfast
21st-century Irish medical doctors
General practitioners from Northern Ireland
Women medical doctors from Northern Ireland
People from Bessbrook
Sportspeople from Newry
2011 World Netball Championships players